Lights Out  is a collaboration album by Turkish rapper Ezhel and Turkish-German rapper Ufo361. It was released on 15 November 2019. The album contains 12 songs. It was produced by Bugy, The Cratez, DJ Artz, Ezhel, Jimmy Torrio and Sonus030.

Track listing

Charts

References

2019 albums
Ezhel albums
Ufo361 albums
Turkish-language albums
German-language albums
Collaborative albums